Winston N. Moss (born December 24, 1965) is a former American football linebacker and coach who served as head coach and general manager of the Los Angeles Wildcats. He was formerly the assistant head coach and linebackers coach for the Green Bay Packers of the National Football League. He was drafted by the Tampa Bay Buccaneers in the second round of the 1987 NFL Draft. Moss attended Miami Southridge High School and was an all-state linebacker.  He played college football at Miami.

Moss also played for the Los Angeles Raiders and Seattle Seahawks.

Coaching career
Moss began his coaching career in 1998 as a defensive quality control assistant for the Seattle Seahawks. He was hired by the New Orleans Saints in 2000 as defensive assistant/quality control; he was promoted to linebackers coach near the end of that season to replace John Bunting, who departed to become head coach at the University of North Carolina. Moss was hired by the Packers to become their linebackers coach on January 19, 2006. He was promoted to assistant head coach by head coach Mike McCarthy on January 15, 2007. Following a disappointing 2008 season for the Packers, Moss was the only major defensive coach not to be fired by McCarthy. In 2016, Moss led the Packers' coaching staff in coaching Team Irvin in the Pro Bowl, replacing McCarthy, who declined to travel to Hawaii due to illness. On December 4, 2018, just two days after McCarthy was fired as head coach, Moss was relieved of his coaching duties after thirteen seasons with the team.

On May 7, 2019, Moss was hired as the head coach and general manager of the Los Angeles Wildcats.

Head coaching record

XFL

References

External links
Green Bay Packers bio

1965 births
Miami Southridge Senior High School alumni
American football linebackers
Green Bay Packers coaches
Living people
Los Angeles Raiders players
Los Angeles Wildcats coaches
Miami Hurricanes football players
New Orleans Saints coaches
Players of American football from Miami
Seattle Seahawks players
Seattle Seahawks coaches
Tampa Bay Buccaneers players
Sports coaches from Miami
Ed Block Courage Award recipients
Coaches of American football from Florida